, better known by her ring name , is a Japanese professional wrestler and mixed martial artist. She is best known for her time in Pro Wrestling Wave. She is also known for her appearances in other Japanese promotions such as Big Japan Pro-Wrestling, Sendai Girls' Pro Wrestling, Ice Ribbon, Oz Academy and Seadlinnng amongst others, as well as American promotions like All Elite Wrestling (AEW) and Shimmer Women Athletes, and Northern Championship Wrestling in Canada.

Professional wrestling career 
Mizumura started her professional wrestling career in 2004 with Gaea Japan under her birth name. She made her in-ring debut on November 3 in which she lost to Carlos Amano.

Pro Wrestling Wave (2009–2019) 
Mizunami made her debut for Pro Wrestling Wave in April 2009 as part of a gauntlet battle royal for the DDT Ironman Heavymetalweight Championship.

All Elite Wrestling (2019, 2021–present) 
In 2019, Mizunami made her debut for the newly formed American promotion All Elite Wrestling (AEW) at their inaugural event Double or Nothing in Las Vegas in which Mizunami, Hikaru Shida and Riho defeated the team of Yuka Sakazaki, Aja Kong and Emi Sakura. Mizunami later revealed that she was considering retirement but changed her mind after her appearance at Double or Nothing.

In 2021, Mizunami was announced as a participant in the AEW Women's Championship Eliminator Tournament as part of the Japanese bracket. In the opening round of the Japanese side of the bracket, Mizunami defeated Maki Itoh via submission on February 15. On February 22, Mizunami picked up a count-out victory over Aja Kong to advance to the Japanese finals. She won the Japanese bracket after defeating Yuka Sakazaki on an all-women's B/R Live special on February 28. On the March 3 edition of AEW Dynamite, Mizunami defeated Nyla Rose in the finals, winning the AEW Women's Championship Eliminator Tournament. For winning the tournament, Mizunami challenged Shida for the AEW Women's World Championship on March 7 at Revolution, but was unsuccessful. On the March 10th episode of Dynamite, Mizunami teamed with Shida and Thunder Rosa where they defeated Nyla Rose, Maki Itoh and Dr. Britt Baker, D.M.D.

Mixed martial arts record 

|-
| Loss
| align=center| 0–1
| Seo Hee Ham
| Submission (armbar)
| Gladiator: Dream, Power and Hope
| 
| align=center| 1
| align=center| 1:05
| Sapporo, Japan
| 
|-

Championships and accomplishments 
 All Elite Wrestling
 AEW Women's World Championship Eliminator Tournament (2021)
 Ice Ribbon
 International Ribbon Tag Team Championship (1 time) - with Misaki Ohata
 JWP Joshi Puroresu
 JWP Junior Championship (1 time)
 Princess of Pro-Wrestling Championship (1 time)
 NEO Japan Ladies Pro-Wrestling
 NEO Tag Team Championship (1 time) - with Aya Yuuki
 Pro Wrestling Wave
 Regina Di WAVE Championship (2 times)
 Wave Tag Team Championship (1 time) - with Misaki Ohata
 Catch the Wave (2016)
 Regina Di WAVE Championship NEXT One Day Tournament (2018)
 Seadlinnng
 Beyond the Sea Single Championship (1 time)
 Sendai Girls' Pro Wrestling
 New Year One Night Tournament (2008)

References

External links 
 

1988 births
Living people
Japanese female professional wrestlers
Japanese female mixed martial artists
Mixed martial artists utilizing wrestling
Professional wrestling trainers